The Roman Catholic Archdiocese of Corrientes (erected 21 January 1910, as the Diocese of Corrientes) is in Argentina and is a metropolitan diocese and its suffragan sees include Goya, Oberá, Posadas, Puerto Iguazú and Santo Tomé. It was elevated on 10 April 1961.

Bishops

Ordinaries
Luis María Niella (1911–1933)
Francisco Vicentín (1934–1972)
Jorge Manuel López (1972–1983), appointed Archbishop of Rosario
Fortunato Antonio Rossi (1983–1994)
Domingo Salvador Castagna (1994–2007)
Andres Stanovnick, O.F.M. Cap. (2007–present)

Auxiliary bishops
Pedro Dionisio Tibiletti (1929-1934), appointed Bishop of San Luis
José Adolfo Larregain, O.F.M.(2020-, elect

Other priest of this diocese who became bishop
Jorge Ramón Chalup, appointed Bishop of Gualeguaychú in 1957

Territorial losses

References

External links

Roman Catholic dioceses in Argentina
Roman Catholic Ecclesiastical Province of Corrientes
Christian organizations established in 1910
Roman Catholic dioceses and prelatures established in the 20th century
1910 establishments in Argentina